Hamid Tamjidi (born 1956) is an Iranian writer, film director, and producer.

Early life 
Tamjidi was born in Tehran and graduated with a degree in film editing from Seda v Sima university. He has four children - Larisa, Kasra, Nakisa, and Parsa. His oldest son, Kasra, has appeared in some of his films.

Early career 
He made his first film The Burnt Twigs as part of his thesis. Then he was hired by the Iran TV network as the official film editor. Two years later he started to work as a writer and director for the same organization. One of his first documentaries Doragh Pond won several awards and a year later he began his first TV series Agate based on his own screenplay. In 1987 his short documentary Call of the pond won the jury's special award at the Fajr international film Festival. At that time he established his film company KASRAFILM and produced and directed several more films. In total, he made six films and TV series, and more than fifty documentaries.

Among Tamjidi's most popular films were the documentary films Tree (1982), Hur 'e Doragh (1983 & winner for best documentary at the third Fajr international film festival) Call of the Pond (1986 winner of the jury's special award at the sixth Fajr international film festival).

The TV series he wrote and directed is The Map (1986) Agate (1988) Learning for Living (1991) Wages of Fear (1992) Playing with Death (1995) Tell Him That I love Him (1999).

The feature films that he wrote directed and produced: The Burnt Twigs (1977) The Mirage (1986) The Rose (1989) Dear Wednesday (1992) Playing with Death (1995) Endless Night (1999).

His last movie "The Endless Night" was banned for public screening and he couldn't continue his work for years. In 2006 he immigrated to Canada and now lives in NB. In 2007 he wrote his first English screenplay Saffron
In 2016 he made his first movie THE BIRD MAY DIE in Canada who won several major awards from international film festivals such as Chandler International Film Festival, Alaska International Film Festival, Depth of Field International Film Festival Competition, Hollywood Film Competition, International Independent Film Awards, Los Angeles Film Awards, 
European Cinematography AWARDS (ECA).

Filmography
Movies
 The Burnt Twigs, 1977
 The Mirage, 1986
 The Rose , 1989
 Dear Wednesday, 1992
 Playing with Death, 1995
 Endless Night, 1999
 The bird May Die, 2016
TV series
 Tree, 1982
 Hur'e Doragh, 1983
 Call of the Pound, 1986
 Aghigh, 1988
 Wages of Fear, 1992
 Playing with Death, 1995
 Tell Him That I Love Him, 1999

References

External links 

  پرنده مردنیست در بانک اطلاعات اینترنتی فیلم‌ها,The Bird May Die (IMDb)
 Kasra Film(کسری فیلم)

1956 births
 Iranian male film actors
 Iranian film directors
 Iranian film producers
 Iranian writers
 Living people
 People from Tehran